Winifred Allen (June 26, 1896 – January 3, 1943) was an American silent film actress. She appeared in several films between 1915 and 1924. She was known later as Winifred Sperry Tenney.

Early years 
Born in New Rochelle, Allen graduated from the public schools there and went on to study at the Art Students' League. The deaths of both parents prompted her to leave school and seek a career in films.

Career 

Allen acted with the Edison and Reliance studios, as well as with other film companies. She appeared in 11 films, listed by the American Film Institute, between 1915 and 1924.

Personal life 
In 1918 she married aviation pioneer Lawrence Sperry (1892-1923), and Flying magazine reported that they were "the first couple to take an aerial honeymoon" after they flew from Amityville to Governors Island. After his death in an airplane crash, she married Vernon E. Tenney.

Selected filmography
When We Were Twenty-One (1915)
Seventeen (1916)
The Long Trail (1917)
 The Haunted House (1917)
 American - That's All (1917)
 For Valour (1917)
 The Man Hater (1917)
 A Successful Failure (1917)
 The Man Who Made Good (1917)
From Two to Six (1918)
Second Youth (1924)

References

External links

 

1896 births
1943 deaths
American silent film actresses
20th-century American actresses